Shabazz Kwame Kussie Baidoo (born 13 April 1988) is an English former professional footballer of Ghanaian and Montserratian descent. Baidoo has since become known for his rap career under the stage name Terminator.

Football career
Born in Hackney, as a youngster Baidoo played at first for Tottenham Hotspur's youth team and then with Arsenal's youth team. He later left Arsenal and had a trial at Norwich City before signing up for Queens Park Rangers.

Baidoo burst onto the scenes rather prematurely, during an injury crisis for Ian Holloway's team towards the end of the 2004–05 season. He made his club debut aged just 16. The following two seasons saw Baidoo feature slightly more regularly, scoring four goals and making numerous substitute appearances and a few starts. However, with John Gregory becoming manager, Baidoo had been used sparingly and out of position, on the wing. Baidoo went on loan to Gillingham in December 2007, but failed to make an appearance for the club, returning to Loftus Road in the New Year. Altogether Baidoo made 33 appearances and scored four goals for QPR.

On 17 January 2008, Baidoo's contract was terminated by mutual consent by QPR. On the same day he joined Dagenham & Redbridge on a deal that lasted until the end of the 2007–08 season. In September 2008, he joined Conference club Lewes on a monthly contract and was released from the club afterwards. In October 2008 he moved on to Croydon Athletic.

During the summer of 2013, Baidoo left Croydon to link up with Biggleswade Town. Around the same time, he had been working as a car trader.

Musical career
As well as his career as a professional footballer, Baidoo has a music career under the stage name Terminator (otherwise known as T or the Darkside Pioneer). According to his GrimeForum page, Baidoo's musical career is secondary to his footballing and is a recreational activity. However, since the end of his football career, his output has been more sporadic and he prefers to be an unsigned artist.

Baidoo is said to have created his own musical subgenre within grime known as "darkside", which predominantly involves a "sluggish flow" coupled with violent lyrics. Some of his musical techniques include rhyming words with themselves and holding one syllable for an extended amount of time to allow a bar to pass. Sometimes Baidoo will even make use of one word lines in his lyrics.

On 19 December 2013, Baidoo released Darkside Pioneer. On 2 November 2015, Baidoo released Darkest Facts of Existence. In March 2019, Baidoo released a surprise project, his third album, Darkest Facts.

Discography

Albums
Darkside Pioneer (2013)
Darkest Facts of Existence (2015)
Darkest Facts (2019)

EP
Friday the 13th (2013)

References

External links

1988 births
Biggleswade Town F.C. players
Bishop's Stortford F.C. players
English people of Ghanaian descent
English people of Montserratian descent
Croydon Athletic F.C. players
Dagenham & Redbridge F.C. players
English footballers
Ghanaian footballers
Gillingham F.C. players
Lewes F.C. players
Wealdstone F.C. players
Living people
Footballers from the London Borough of Hackney
Queens Park Rangers F.C. players
English Football League players
Association football forwards